
WGHS may stand for:

Schools

United States
 Walden Grove High School in Sahuarita, Arizona
 Watkins Glen High School in Watkins Glen, New York
 Webster Groves High School in Webster Groves, Missouri
 West Gadsden High School in Gadsden County, Florida
 West Geauga High School in Chesterland, Ohio
 West Greene High School (Pennsylvania) in Waynesburg
 West Greene High School (Tennessee) in Mosheim
 Western Guilford High School in Greensboro, North Carolina
 Willow Glen High School in San Jose, California

Elsewhere
 Westlake Girls High School in Auckland, New Zealand
 Whangarei Girls' High School in Whangarei, New Zealand
 Waitaki Girls' High School in Oamaru, New Zealand
 Wolverhampton Girls' High School in Wolverhampton, United Kingdom
 Wakefield Girls' High School in Wakefield, United Kingdom
 Willoughby Girls High School in Sydney, Australia
 Wesley Girls' High School in Kakumdo, Ghana
 Westville Girls' High School in Westville, South Africa
 Wynberg Girls' High School in Wynberg, South Africa

Others
 Winslow Genealogical & Historical Society in Winslow Township, New Jersey
 WGHS-88.5, a defunct radio station of Glenbard West High School, Glen Ellyn, Illinois